Cyana trigutta is a moth of the family Erebidae. It was described by Francis Walker in 1854. It is found in Cameroon, Niger and Sierra Leone.

References

Cyana
Moths described in 1854
Erebid moths of Africa